USS Dictator was a single-turreted ironclad monitor, designed for speed, and to sail on the open sea. Originally to be named , the Navy Department preferred a more aggressive name, and she was renamed Dictator. She served in two different periods; from 1864 to 1865, serving with the North Atlantic Blockading Squadron, and from 1869 to 1877, with the North Atlantic Fleet. After her final decommissioning in 1877, she was sold for scrap in 1883.

Description 
It is thought that she had a light hurricane deck amidships. She was designed to carry 1,000 tons of coal. She was armed with two  Dahlgren smoothbore guns. She had a crew of 174 men.

Service history 

Originally she was to be called , however she was named Dictator on 1 April 1862, after John Ericsson requested it from the Assistant Secretary of the Navy, Gustavus Fox.

Dictator was laid down by Delamater Iron Works, in New York, New York, under contract with John Ericsson on 16 August 1862, and launched on 26 December 1863. The ship was commissioned on 11 November 1864, under the command of Commander J. Rodgers, with a crew of 174.

Construction problems with her powerplant kept her initial service relatively brief and inactive. Assigned to duty with North Atlantic Blockading Squadron, Dictator cruised on the Atlantic coast from 15 December 1864 until placed out of commission on 5 September 1865 at the League Island Navy Yard. She remained in ordinary there until 1869.

The ship was recommissioned on 20 July 1869, with a repair cost of $59,654.27. Dictator served with the North Atlantic Fleet until 28 June 1871 when she was again placed out of commission. She was in ordinary at New York Navy Yard until 12 January 1874 when she was recommissioned for service on the North Atlantic Station. Dictator was decommissioned at League Island on 1 June 1877 and remained there until sold on 27 September 1883, to A. Purvis & Son, for a cost of $40,250 dollars.

Citations

Sources

Books

Websites

Journals

Further reading

External links 
 
 
 

Ships built in New York City
Monitors of the United States Navy
Ironclad warships of the Union Navy
1863 ships
American Civil War monitors of the United States